Simon Sephrenus Cook (September 15, 1831 – May 15, 1892) represented Dundas in the Legislative Assembly of Ontario as a Liberal member from 1867 to 1874.

He was born in Williamsburgh in Dundas County in Upper Canada in 1831 and educated at the Potsdam Academy in Potsdam, New York. He lived in Morrisburg and was involved in the timber trade. In 1881, he was appointed registrar for the county. His brother James William represented Dundas in the Legislative Assembly of the Province of Canada and his brother Hermon Henry served in both the federal and provincial legislatures.

External links
 
 
 

Simon Cook
1831 births
1892 deaths
Ontario Liberal Party MPPs
People from the United Counties of Stormont, Dundas and Glengarry